Karl-August Stolze (born 28 August 1920) is a German former sailor who competed in the 1960 Summer Olympics and in the 1968 Summer Olympics.

References

External links
 

1920 births
Possibly living people
German male sailors (sport)
Olympic sailors of the United Team of Germany
Olympic sailors of West Germany
Sailors at the 1960 Summer Olympics – 5.5 Metre
Sailors at the 1968 Summer Olympics – 5.5 Metre